A laser warning receiver is a type of warning system used as a passive military defence. It detects, analyzes, and locates directions of laser emissions from laser guidance systems and laser rangefinders. Then it alerts the crew and can start various countermeasures, like smoke screen, aerosol screen (e.g. Shtora), active laser self-defence weapon with laser dazzler (LSDW, used on the Chinese Type 99 main battle tank), laser jammer, etc.

Detectors used in LWR are usually based on a semiconductor photodetector array, which is typically cryogenically or thermal-electric cooled. Sometimes avalanche photodiodes (APD), photoconductivity, photoelectromagnetic, or photodiffusion devices are used even without cooling. Some devices detect only the main beam of foreign lasers while others detect even scattered rays.

Produced by 

 ASELSAN
 BAE Systems
 Thales Optronics
 Elbit Systems
 Global Industrial Defence Solutions
 PentaTec
 Hensoldt

Models 
Some models used by US are listed:
  AN/AVR-2 and AN/AVR2A
  AN/AAR-47
 AN/VVR-1
 AN/VVR-2

See also 
 Radar warning receiver

References

External links 
 ASELSAN LİAS for Airborne Platforms
 ASELSAN LİS for Naval Platforms
 ASELSAN TLUS for Ground Platforms
 AN/AVR-2 LWS at fas (airborne)
 Goodrich AN/VVR-1 Laser Warning Receiver System (LWRS) 
 Goodrich AN/VVR-2 Laser Warning Receiver System (LWRS) (land laser warner) 
 High-speed FT Spectrometer for Laser Warning Receivers
 Battlefield Laser Warning Receiver Homebrew laser warning receiver

Warning systems
Military lasers